Hōri Mahue Ngata (8 August 1919 – 15 February 1989) was a New Zealand Ngāti Porou farmer, railway worker, workers’ camp supervisor, accountant, lexicographer and the grandson of Sir Āpirana Ngata. He served in the 28th New Zealand (Maori) Battalion.

Ngata compiled an English–Māori dictionary, although he died before it was ready for publication. His son Whai Ngata, a broadcaster, completed the work, with the assistance of others, and it was published as English–Maori Dictionary by Learning Media Ltd in 1993. It was later published on the web at www.learningmedia.co.nz/ngata/ as the Ngata Dictionary.

References

1919 births
1989 deaths
New Zealand lexicographers
New Zealand Māori writers
Ngāti Porou people
New Zealand accountants
Māori language revivalists
New Zealand railway workers
Hori Mahue
20th-century lexicographers